Giandomenico Basso (born 15 September 1973, in Montebelluna) is an Italian rally driver.

Rally career
After competing in karting from 1981, Basso has been rallying since 1994. Basso has driven Fiats throughout his rallying career. He made his World Rally Championship debut on Rallye Sanremo in 1998, in a Fiat Seicento. In 2001 and 2002 he competed on WRC rounds in the Junior World Rally Championship in a Fiat Punto S1600, finishing fifth in 2001 and fourth in 2002. In 2006 Basso won the inaugural Intercontinental Rally Challenge and the European Rally Championship in a Fiat Grande Punto S2000 for Abarth. In 2007 he won the Italian Rally Championship. In 2009 he won again the European Rally Championship, driving an Abarth Grande Punto S2000.

Basso used to be co-driven by Flavio Guglielmini, who died in a crash on the European Championship round Rally Bulgaria in July 2009 as co-driver to Swiss driver Brian Lavio. Basso has also been co-driven by Luigi Pirollo and currently by Mitia Dotta.

WRC results

JWRC Results

SWRC results

WRC-2 results

IRC results

References

External links

1973 births
Living people
People from Montebelluna
Italian rally drivers
European Rally Championship drivers
Intercontinental Rally Challenge drivers
World Rally Championship drivers
Sportspeople from the Province of Treviso